Terrorism in Denmark refers to terrorist attacks carried out in Denmark or by people connected to Denmark. Like other countries Denmark increased its focus on defending against terrorist attacks after the September 11 attacks in New York in 2001. The September 11 attacks led to strengthened laws in a number of areas. 31 May 2002 the parliament of Denmark (Danish: Folketing) approved anti-terror legislation with the aim of preventing terrorism in Denmark and internationally. The new legislation aligned with the definitions of terrorism which were in use by the European Union and the United Nations.

Terrorist incidents and trials

1985 
1985 Copenhagen bombings - Main synagogue in Copenhagen and airline office were hit by a bomb placed by Hezbollah terrorists. While no people were injured in the attack on the synagogue, a second bomb placed by the same group destroyed the Copenhagen offices of the American Northwest Orient Airlines, killing one person and injuring 26. Several Arabs residing in Europe, among them Mohammed Abu Talb, were later convicted for these and other attacks.

2005

2006

2007 
2007 Al Qaeda Plot in Copenhagen -  Danish police officers and Security Intelligence Service agents arrested eight, six of which were released after questioning. The two remaining, described as Islamic militants with ties to Al Qaeda, were convicted in 2008 of planning terrorism with the use of bombs.

In 2007, Morocco-born Said Mansour was the first to be charged with the offence of inciting terrorism. Material produced by him has been found by several convicted terrorists worldwide. In 2014, he was sentenced again by the Fredriksberg court to four years in jail for publishing extremist islamist material thereby supporting al-Qaeda. In 2015 the Østre Landsret upholds the sentenced and strips Mansour of his Danish citizenship and issues a deportation order. In June 2016, the supreme court upholds the deportation order. After the supreme court decision, Danish authorities negotiated with Morocco on a repatriation treaty. He was deported in January 2019.

2010 
2010 Copenhagen terror plot - Security services in Denmark and Sweden thwarted a terrorist plot against Jyllands-Posten, the publisher of the controversial cartoons of Muhammad in 2005.  In several raids they detained five men, who were described as militant islamists. Automatic weapons, together with ammunition and silencers, were seized by the police.

Hotel Jørgensen explosion -
An attempted letter bomb attack by a Belgian of Chechen ethnicity.

2012 
Two Somali brothers residing in Denmark were arrested in May 2012 on suspicion of preparing a terrorist attack and the elder was alleged to have undergone training by Al-Shabaab. In February 2013 they were charged with financing terrorism and terrorist training. The younger brother admitted to supporting Al-Shabaab in the district court. Upon appeal, both brothers were sentenced for attempted terrorist training in the appeals court.

2015 
2015 Copenhagen shootings - shooting attacks in Copenhagen beginning in the afternoon of 14 February at a public event called "Art, Blasphemy and Freedom of Expression" at Krudttønden cultural centre, followed by another at the Great Synagogue just after midnight (i.e., 15 February), and finally the killing of the perpetrator in the early morning by police. Two victims and the perpetrator were killed, while five police officers were wounded.

2016 
The Kundby case - a 2016 plan to bomb two schools in Denmark, including a Jewish school in Copenhagen. The girl, 15-years-old at the time of her plan and a recent convert to Islam, was convicted in 2017.

2016 Copenhagen terror plot - an attempted attack on Copenhagen with bombs and knives by two Syrian refugees (one living in Sweden, another in Germany) under direction of Islamic State instructions.

2018 
Ringsted terror plot - A Norwegian-Iranian was arrested and suspected of having planned Iranian intelligence operations in Denmark. Both Norwegian PST and Danish PET also suspected the man to take part in the planning of an assassination against the leader of the Iranian group Arab Struggle Movement for the Liberation of Ahvaz. He was arrested in Gothenburg in Sweden on 21 October.

2019 
Danish Security and Intelligence Service (PET) and police arrested around 20 people throughout Denmark 11 December 2019, 8 of which have been charged with attempted terrorism. They had bought bomb-making materials and tried (unsuccessfully) to acquire firearms. It is unknown if their target was in Denmark or abroad, but the motive was radical Islamist ideology.

References

Terrorism in Denmark